The Football Federation of the 4th Department Guairá (Federación de Fútbol Cuarto Departamento Guairá) is the departamental governing body of football (soccer) in the department of Guairá, in Paraguay. The federation is responsible for the organization of football leagues in the different cities of the department and it is also the regulator of the clubs. The main office of this federation is located in the city of Villarrica.

Tournaments for each league of this federation are played every year to determine the best teams. Afterwards, the champions of each league face each other to determine the best team in the department, with the overall winner being promoted to a higher division in the Paraguayan football league system.

Leagues in Guairá

Liga Azucarera de Fútbol
The Liga Azucarera de Fútbol is based in the city of Tebicuary. The following teams are part of this league:
 27 de Noviembre
 29 de Setiembre
 3 de Mayo
 Sportivo Capellan
 Nacional
 Sportivo Loma Pindo
 Libertad

Liga Deportiva Gral. Eugenio A. Garay
The Liga Deportiva Gral. Eugenio A. Garay is based in the city of General Eugenio A. Garay. The following teams are part of this league:
 Sol de Ybytyruzu
 Juventud Unidos
 12 de Junio
 15 de Agosto
 25 de Enero
 Atletico Juvenil
 Sportivo San Antonio
 Sportivo Union
 Sportivo 3 de Mayo Cerrito
 24 de Junio
 19 de Marzo

Liga Guaireña de Fútbol
The Liga Guaireña de Fútbol is based in the city of Villarrica. The following teams are part of this league:A la pagina de la liga
 Estero Bellaco
 Silvio Pettirossi
 Cerro Cora
 Olimpia
 Atletico Guarani
 Sportivo Ñumí
 Deportivo Atletico Central
 Parque del Guairá
 3 de Febrero
 Deportivo Rincón

Liga Iturbeña de Fútbol
The Liga Iturbeña de Fútbol is based in the city of Iturbe. The following teams are part of this league:
 Atletico El Porvenir
 12 de Junio
 Sport Juventud
 4 de Octubre
 27 de Noviembre
 25 de Noviembre
 Union S.D. Potrero San Genaro
 Deportivo Rojas Potrero

Liga Deportiva José Fassardi
The Liga Deportiva José Fassardi is based in the city of José Fassardi. The following teams are part of this league:
 Capitán Miranda
 Atlético Santa Rosa
 Destello Juvenil (el mejor equipo de la zona)
 Independiente FBC
 Deportivo Santa Rosa
 12 de Junio
 Fassardi Sport Club
 Sagrado Corazón de Jesús

Liga Deportiva Paso Yobai
The Liga Deportiva Paso Yobai is based in the city of Paso Yobai. The following teams are part of this league:
 Deportivo Azteca
 12 de Octubre
 S.D. Carai Chive
 Atlético Independiente
 Atlético Juventud
 Atlético 8 de Diciembre
 Sportivo Caaguy Poty

Liga Deportiva de Ybytyruzú
The Liga Deportiva de Ybytyruzú is based in the city of Mbocayaty del Guairá. The following teams are part of this league:
 Sportivo Santa Bárbara
 General Francisco Roa
 Cerro Porteño
 1 de Marzo
 20 de Julio
 Guaraní
 Cap. Troche
 Independiente
 8 de Diciembre
 15 de Mayo
 Deportivo Juventud
 Sol de America 
 Dr. Botrell

Liga Itapeña de Fútbol
The Liga Itapeña de Fútbol is based in the city of Itapé. The following teams are part of this league:
 Deportivo San Ignacio
 Libertad
 15 de Mayo
 Tte.Villagra 
 Olimpia
 Cerro Porteño
 Nacional
 General Caballero
 8 de Diciembre
 San Miguel
 Guaraní
 Deportivo Union
 FC Guaraní
 3 de Mayo
 Rubio Ñu

Liga Independencia de Futbol

The Liga Independencia de Futbol is based in the city of Melgarejo. The following teams are part of this league:
 Vista Alegre
 19 de Julio
 Rubio Ñu
 Atlético Santa Cecilia
 Deportivo Alemán
 Sport Pañetey
 Independencia
 11 Estrellas
 Independiente
 Atlético Carlos Pfannl
 Sport Portero del Carmen
 Deportivo Yroysa

External links
 UFI Website

Guaira
Guairá Department